Veľké Ludince is a village and municipality in the Levice District in the Nitra Region of Slovakia.

History
In historical records the village was first mentioned in 1282.

Geography
The village lies at an altitude of 182 metres and covers an area of 31.804 km2. It has a population of about 1,685 people.

Ethnicity
The village is about 83% Magyar, 16% Slovak and 1% Gypsy.

Facilities
The village has a public library a gym and football pitch.

External links
https://web.archive.org/web/20070513023228/http://www.statistics.sk/mosmis/eng/run.html

Villages and municipalities in Levice District